Nicholas Matthew Balding (born July 5, 1989), professionally known as Nic Nac, is an American record producer and songwriter from El Cerrito, California. He first started out in the group Go Dav in the early 2000s, and is currently in the group Starting Six. He is best known for producing singles such as Chris Brown's "Loyal", Pia Mia's "Do It Again", DJ Khaled's global hits, "I'm the One" and "No Brainer".

Early life
Nicholas Balding was born on July 5, 1989 in El Cerrito, California. He started to DJ when he was in fifth grade. His parents got him something called a "DJ In A Box" that came with two turn tables, a mixer, and two speakers. He just used basic drum beats and didn't know how to play piano yet at the time, as he does now. He started to DJ because he lived up the street from a Guitar Center and went there everyday to hang around the people who worked there. They showed him how to DJ, so by the time he got to high school, he met a kid in his class who made beats and he gave him a program. In 2003, when he was in the eighth grade, Balding and his cousin started a DJing group; they were DJing for their friends parties, for school dances, and so on. He was playing songs by different rappers such as the Ying Yang Twins, E-40, Lil Jon, and Too $hort.

Career
He got into production when he was fourteen years old in high school and was using Fruity Loops (now FL Studio). Later in high school, Nicholas formed a group with four rappers and one singer called, Go Dav. Nick was the only member that wasn't from Oakland, California. They got famous for their song "Ride or Die Chick" and were known mainly in the East Bay area. Being in the group, made him more interested in furthering his career in music. In his freshman year he got together with some of his best friends at St Mary's High School in Berkeley, and started a group, going by the name Starting Six.[6]

His first major success as a producer was the song, "143" by Bobby Brackins and Ray J. He made enough money from that song and was able to move out of his mother's house and relocated to Los Angeles. He got a manager after moving to L.A. but things didn't work out between them later on.

After "143", the next big hit he produced was "Beat It" by Sean Kingston, Chris Brown, and Wiz Khalifa. After making "Beat It", Balding was trying to get a manager and was trying to get better at producing. Nicholas's and Chris Brown's managers were close friends. Later in 2013, he produced the single by Chris Brown titled "Loyal". During the making of "Loyal", rappers Ty Dolla Sign and B.o.B wrote the chorus and first verse. Balding's manager played the beat for Chris Brown's manager and Chris took the beat for his own the same day. He cut the track that night and got Lil Wayne, French Montana, and Too Short on it all within a week. Balding currently lives with six of his high school friends, one of them being his cousin that he grew up with. They have a front and back house, (three live in the front, three in the back). They formed the group called Starting Six and have released several videos online.

In 2015, he then produced Chris Brown and Tyga's single "Ayo". Balding delivered, his production replete with an echoing "I neeeed you" helium vocal sample.

Production style
Nic Nac says, he always had these little video gamey melodies, and put more R&B chords underneath that melody. Even if it is dark chords, a happy melody, a video game melody, is always in his beats. He's always done that since high school, so it was always his own thing. He also uses a loop featuring the lyrics, "let me see you" in most of his songs, most notably in Chris Brown's 'Loyal'

Personal life
In 2014, he started dating singer Pia Mia.

Production discography

References

^ 6. https://broadview.sacredsf.org/3697/a-e/starting-six-east-bay-group-on-path-to-dream/

External links

Nic Nac discography at Discogs

Living people
American audio engineers
American hip hop record producers
American pop musicians
People from El Cerrito, California
Rappers from California
Songwriters from California
1989 births
Engineers from California
21st-century American rappers
American male pianists
21st-century American pianists
Record producers from California
21st-century American male musicians
American male songwriters
FL Studio users